Jerri Sher (born Jerri Iris Kaplan, also known as Jerri Kaplan Sher) is an American director, writer, producer, and author known for her work on documentary films such as Quiet Explosions: Healing the Brain and Santa Monica Cares: Step Up, which won an Emmy Award, as well as television series Live Life. She has also written two books: How to Have a Successful Bridal Shower A to Z, with More Than 500 Creative Ideas and The Twig Painter.

She received two Los Angeles Emmy Awards in the category Public, Municipal, and Operator Produced Cable at the 67th LA Area Emmys for her work on the short film Santa Monica Cares: Step Up.

Early life 
Sher grew up in Fall River, Massachusetts. She attended B.M.C. Durfee High School, graduating in 1966. She went on to earn a bachelor’s degree in fine arts from the University of Massachusetts Amherst and a master’s degree in art education from Springfield College.

Career 
Prior to her career in film, Sher worked as an art professor at Springfield College, an elementary school teacher, and a sales and marketing manager for the trucking company Guaranteed Overnight Delivery.

Sher joined the Directors Guild of America in 1998. She produced the 1999 film The Autumn Heart, which starred Tyne Daly and Ally Sheedy.

Sher also directed the documentary Soul of an Empire, which focused on New York City’s 42nd Street. For Soul of an Empire, Sher received the Best Documentary Award at the Big Bear Lake International Film Festival and the Tampa Bay Festival. Soul of an Empire also received the Special Jury Award at Savannah Film & Video Festival.

In 2009, Sher published her first novel, The Twig Painter. The novel is a medical mystery that centers on finding the cure for HIV/AIDS. Sher also produced and directed the short film Live Life A-Z, which was released in 2011. The film was chosen as a winner in the Experimental category of the 2011 My Hero International Film Festival.

Sher produced and directed the Step Up segment of the documentary program Santa Monica Cares, which won two Los Angeles Emmy Awards in 2015. The segment centered on Leroy Simpkins, a former homeless man who went on to become a physical trainer and board member of the nonprofit Step Up.

In 2017, Sher published the nonfiction book How to Have a Successful Bridal Shower A to Z, with More Than 500 Creative Ideas.

Sher wrote, directed, and produced the documentary Quiet Explosions: Healing the Brain, which was released in 2020. The film premiered at Spokane International Film Festival, before being screened as a limited release at locations such as the Laemmle Theater in Glendale, California and Big Horn Cinemas in Cody, Wyoming. The film featured interviewees such as Mark Rypien, Anthony Davis, and Joe Rogan.

Sher also directed and co-produced the series Live Life: Awaken Your Inner Power with Discovery Communications, which is set to be released by Tri-Continental Distribution in 2022.

Filmography

Film

Television

Bibliography 

 2017, How to Have a Successful Bridal Shower A to Z, with More Than 500 Creative Ideas
 2019, The Twig Painter

Awards and nominations 
In addition to the film awards below, Sher was awarded the Distinguished Alumni Award by the Durfee High School Alumni Association in 2019.

References

External links 

 
 Jerri Sher official website
 Quiet Explosions: Healing the Brain film website

Living people
Television producers from California
American film producers
American film directors
Film directors from California
Year of birth missing (living people)